Cheiloporinidae is a family of bryozoans belonging to the order Cheilostomatida.

Genera:
 Cheilopora Levinsen, 1909
 Cheiloporina Canu & Bassler, 1923
 Crustoporina Guha & Nathan, 1996
 Cyttaridium Harmer, 1957
 Hagiosynodos Bishop & Hayward, 1989
 Pachystomaria MacGillivray, 1895
 Retelepralia Gordon & Arnold, 1998

References

Cheilostomatida